Everyday Life is the eighth studio album by British rock band Coldplay. It was released on 22 November 2019 by Parlophone in the United Kingdom and Atlantic Records in the United States. It is a double album released as a single CD, with the first half titled Sunrise and the other Sunset. The release coincided with Everyday Life – Live in Jordan, in which performances of each half of the album were live streamed from the Amman Citadel in Jordan, at sunrise and sunset, respectively. The record is a sequel to Coldplay’s fourth studio album Viva la Vida or Death and All His Friends (2008). Many returning producers and collaborators joined the band's efforts including Rik Simpson, Dan Green, Bill Rahko, Davide Rossi, and Emily Lazar. 

Speculation about the album's existence persisted since their previous record, A Head Full of Dreams, as rumours circulated that Coldplay would disband. It is the first album by the band to feature profanity (on the tracks "Trouble in Town", "Arabesque" and "Guns") and is also their second studio album, after Ghost Stories (2014), not to be supported by a major worldwide tour. 

Everyday Life received generally positive reviews from music critics, who praised its experimental alt rock direction, the shift to politically charged lyrics, and varied song styles in contrast to their old roots with albums like Parachutes and Viva la Vida or Death and All His Friends. However, others felt that the album lacked thematic consistency. Commercially, Everyday Life earned the band their eighth consecutive number-one album on the UK Albums Chart and their seventh top-ten album on the Billboard 200 in the US. 

The album was supported by four overall singles: "Orphans" and "Arabesque" in October 2019, "Everyday Life" in November 2019 and "Champion of the World" in February 2020. At the 63rd Grammy Awards the album garnered two nominations: Best Recording Package and Album of the Year, marking the band's second nomination in the latter category and their first since Viva la Vida.

Recording 
Some tracks from Everyday Life have roots a decade earlier in 2009, as producer Dan Green explains – "We actually started this album just before Mylo Xyloto in 2009, there were songs from this record that had been around since then which just didn't seem to fit on other albums. The single 'Arabesque' was one of those." Rik Simpson, another longtime member of the production team, stated that this album differed in recording style compared to previous records because three members of the band lived in the UK while lead singer Chris Martin lived in the US. The band hoped to travel somewhere to inspire the global sounds of Everyday Life rather than be restricted to a single studio. Therefore, Dan Green created a mobile studio, inspired from jam sessions during their previous world tour, to be set up in various international locations. They include but are not limited to: Villa Tombolino in Tuscany, the Woodshed studios in Los Angeles, The Bakery and Beehive studios in London, and a studio in Johannesburg, South Africa. Travelling around the globe is reflected in the experimental mix of genre influences present on the record including classical, afrobeat, jazz-fusion, etc. The album was one of the first non-reissue albums to be mixed using Dolby Atmos technology, with the Atmos version made available on Amazon Music, Tidal and Apple Music.

Composition
Everyday Life is a considerable shift in musical experimentation compared to the band's previous albums, with critics deeming it their most experimental release. Its release marks Coldplay's first double album, with the halves titled Sunrise and Sunset respectively (similarly to X&Y, which is split into an "X" half and a "Y" half, despite being a single album). The album includes a 30-second field recording of clock tower bells ringing the Westminster Quarters melody and spread across 8 tracks, entitled "God = Love", which serves as an interlude for each side of the album. The track titles spell the name of this section and are revealed when the CD is loaded into a computer.
 
When compared to previous albums released by the band, the lyrics make a stark contrast: even though it still showcases many themes of positivity, equality, unity, hope, legacy, the importance of emotions, and humanity, it also includes racism, police brutality, gun control, loss and pain, plus references of war in terrorism-inflicted countries. The song "Trouble in Town" includes a sample from a 2013 incident involving racially-motivated profiling and harassment of a man by a Philadelphia police officer, it is the first Coldplay song to feature profanity (although it is the police officer in the sound recording who uses profanity rather than the track's lyrics), along with "Arabesque" and "Guns" (which both feature profanity in their actual lyrics). Martin described the album saying that:

Promotion
On 13 October 2019, black-and-white posters featuring the band teasing the album, and the date "22 November 1919" appeared in various cities around the world, including São Paulo, Berlin, Hong Kong and Sydney. On 19 October, a video teaser featuring the same theme was also released. Two days later, several fans began receiving typewritten notes from the band in the mail.

On 23 October, the track listing was announced by the band in the advertising sections of several newspapers around the world. This included the North Wales Daily Post, where guitarist Jonny Buckland "once had a holiday job". The 19 November edition of the New Zealand newspaper Otago Daily Times featured advertisements containing lyrics to the tracks from the album. The artwork for the album was created by Argentine artist Pilar Zeta, who worked on the artwork for the band's previous album A Head Full of Dreams.

The booklet included in the CD, vinyl, and digital download releases of the album feature lyrics for all tracks and credits. In the bifold of the book features a picture of a large billboard with "Music of the Spheres" in large text and "Coldplay coming soon" in the bottom left corner, teasing their following album Music of the Spheres. The poster also features a preliminary version of the album's artwork, the Map of the Spheres.

Live performances 
During an online press conference on 1 November, Coldplay announced they would perform Everyday Life in two shows at the Amman Citadel in Jordan, on 22 November, the release date of the album. The first show showcased the band performing the first half of the album Sunrise at 4:00 a.m. GMT, and the second show featured the performance of Sunset at 2:00 p.m. GMT. The shows, which were livestreamed on YouTube, marked the band's first ever performances in the country. Both shows were promoted and advertised as YouTube Originals. The two shows were performed without an audience, but the following night the band performed their first public show at the Citadel. On 18 November, the band announced a one-off show at the London Natural History Museum on 25 November, with proceeds from the show to be donated to an environmental charity. However, the band announced that they would not play a world tour to promote the album until they had addressed concerns regarding travel and the environmental impact of the shows. After taking two years to craft a sustainability plan for touring, Coldplay would embark on the Music of the Spheres World Tour in March 2022 in support of their following album, Music of the Spheres. The tour would incorporate songs from Everyday Life into the set list.

Singles 
"Orphans" and "Arabesque" were released as the lead singles on 24 October 2019 during the Annie Mac show on BBC Radio 1. On the next day, a music video for "Orphans" came out. Its companion piece, "Arabesque", however, does not have one. "Everyday Life" was then released a promotional single on 3 November 2019, with its video debut on 9 December 2019 and the song's appearance on United Kingdom and Italy's contemporary hit radio in the following weeks. Two days before the album's release, a music video for "Daddy" and a lyric video for "Champion of the World" were released, the latter was released as a promotional single to the United States' radio stations on 25 February 2020. The "Cry Cry Cry" music video, which was co-directed by Chris' girlfriend Dakota Johnson, was released on 14 February 2020. The "Trouble in Town" music video was released on 12 March 2020.

Critical reception

Everyday Life received generally positive reviews from critics. At Metacritic, which assigns a normalised rating out of 100 to reviews from mainstream critics, the album has an average score of 73 out of 100 based on 26 reviews, which indicates "generally favorable reviews", becoming the band's second highest-scored album on the website, behind A Rush of Blood to the Head. Writing for The Daily Telegraph, Neil McCormick acclaimed the album's experimentation, stating that Everyday Life "feels organic, analogue and playful as Coldplay dip into different musical genres", and further highlighted Martin's "golden gift for melody, almost simplistically direct lyrics and emotive crooning". Chris DeVille of Stereogum considered that the use of multiple genres worked "more often than not", and commended the band's "more nuanced" exploration of social issues, concluding that it was a "truly great album". In her review for NME, Charlotte Krol claimed that the record "is proof that Coldplay are more adventurous than they're often given credit for", although some of its songs are "sometimes more exciting in theory than in practice".

Other reviewers were less enthusiastic about the album's experimentation. Although The Guardians Alexis Petridis considered it a "laudable intention", he found the album "wildly uneven" and was critical of the "lyrical vagueness" of various songs dealing with "sociopolitical matters", but complimented "a couple of acoustic tracks with genuine emotional heft". In the same vein, Adam White of The Independent described the album as a "valiant, if flawed, attempt to break from tradition" and a "fascinating, occasionally brilliant curio", but considered that the band were "still very much figuring out how to respond to a world that has become meaner, dirtier and crueller", nevertheless considering the effort admirable. Ludovic Hunter-Tilney of the Financial Times found the album "platitudinising", but considered Martin's songwriting "more focused than usual"; he additionally noted the album's "quirky production" and balancing of "contradictory urges to play it safe and take a risk".

Year-end lists

Accolades

Commercial performance
Everyday Life debuted at number-one on the UK Albums Chart with 80,974 units sold, becoming Coldplay's eighth consecutive studio album to achieve the feat and the third-fastest selling record of the year in the United Kingdom, behind Ed Sheeran's No.6 Collaborations Project and Lewis Capaldi's Divinely Uninspired to a Hellish Extent. It debuted number seven on the United States' Billboard 200 with 48,000 equivalent units, including 36,000 pure album sales. According to IFPI, the album sold 740,000 copies around the world in 2019, making it the 11th biggest record of the year in pure sales. The release also made Coldplay the seventh most successful group of said period.

Track listing
Coldplay's songwriting members are Guy Berryman, Jonny Buckland, Will Champion and Chris Martin.Notes
  indicates a co-producer
  indicates an additional producer
 Producers Rik Simpson, Dan Green and Bill Rahko are credited collectively as "The Dream Team".
 "Broken" is stylised as "BROKШN" on physical copies, while on digital media is stylised as "BrokEn".
 "WOTW / POTP" stands for and is rendered in the physical edition liner notes as "Wonder of the World / Power of the People".
 "Church" features female vocals by Norah Shaqur.
 "Broken" features a choir consisting of Mabvuto Carpenter, Denise Green, Stevie Mackey, Neka Hamilton, Surrenity XYZ, LaMarcus Eldrigde and Dorian Holley.
 "Arabesque" features vocals by Stromae.
 "When I Need a Friend" features the London Voices choir conducted by Ben Parry.
 "God = Love" is only available on the CD edition of the album and works as an interlude between the Sunrise and Sunset halves of the record. It consists of a 30-second field recording of clock tower bells ringing the Westminster Quarters melody and spread across 8 tracks. The track titles spell the name of this section and are revealed when the CD is loaded into a computer.
 "Orphans" features a choir consisting of Marwa Kreitem, Nadeen Fanous, Garine Antreassian, Bashar Murad, Norah Shaqur, Apple Martin, Moses Martin, Ben Oerlemans, Bill Rahko, Aluna and Jocelyn 'Jozzy' Donald.
 "Èkó" features backing vocals by Tiwa Savage.
 "" ("Bani Adam") features the voice of Dr. Shahrzad (Sherry) Sami reciting Persian poet Saadi's poem of the same name in the Persian language. The expression translates literally to "Children of Adam", or "Human Beings" within the context of the poem.
 "Everyday Life" features backing vocals by Marianne Champion.
 "Church", "Cry Cry Cry" and "Everyday Life" feature backing vocals by Jacob Collier.
After many requests from fans, the Japanese bonus track "Flags" was released internationally on streaming services on 21 December 2020.

Sample credits
 "Church" beat inspiration by Mikkel Eriksen and Tor Erik Hermansen. Contains a sample from "Jaga Ji Laganay", as performed and written by Amjad Sabri.
 "Trouble in Town" contains a rendition of "Jikelele", sung by the children of the African Children's Feeding Scheme (ACFS), Soweto, Johannesburg. It also contains a recording of an incident involving racial profiling of pedestrians by a Philadelphia police officer in 2013. 
 "Arabesque" includes an excerpt from the film Music Is the Weapon.
 "When I Need a Friend" includes a sample from the film Everything Is Incredible.
 "Cry Cry Cry" contains elements from "Cry, Baby", written by Bert Berns and Jerry Ragovoy.
 "" contains a sample from "The Sun", written by Alice Coltrane.
 "" and "Champion of the World" contain a sample from "Otuto Nke Chukwu", as performed by Harcourt Whyte.
 "Champion of the World" contains an interpolation of "Los Angeles, Be Kind", written by Scott Hutchison, Simon Lidell and Andy Monaghan.

Personnel
Credits adapted from the "Orphans / Arabesque" liner notes.

 Guy Berryman – bass guitar, percussion
 Will Champion – drums and percussion, keyboards, backing vocals, guitar
 Jonny Buckland – guitars, keyboards
 Chris Martin – lead vocals, guitars, piano, keyboards

 Aluna – choir vocal 
 Garine Antreassian – choir vocal 
 Jocelyn 'Jozzy' Donald – choir vocal
 Nadeen Fanous – choir vocal 
 Marwa Kreitem – choir vocal
 Apple Martin – choir vocal
 Moses Martin – choir vocal
 Bashar Murad – choir vocal 
 Ben Oerlemans – choir vocal
 Bill Rahko – choir vocal 
 Norah Shaqur – choir vocal 
 Stromae – vocals 

 Omorinmade Anikulapo-Kuti – alto saxophone 
 Babatunde Ankra – trombone 
 Drew Goddard – guitar 
 Dan Green – keyboards 
 Samir Joubran – oud
 Wissam Joubran – oud
 Adnan Joubran – oud
 Femi Kuti – horn 
 Made Kuti – orchestrionics 
 Ayoola Magbagbeola – tenor saxophone 
 Max Martin – keyboards 
 Gbenga Ogundeji – trumpet 
 Bill Rahko – keyboards
 Davide Rossi – strings 
 Rik Simpson – keyboards

 Dan Green – producer , programming 
 Emily Lazar – mastering
 Max Martin – producer and programming 
 Bill Rahko – producer , programming 
 Rik Simpson – producer , programming 
 Mark "Spike" Stent – mixing

 Erwan Abbas – assistant engineering 
 Chris Allgood – assistant mastering
 Lionel Capouillez – additional engineering 
 Michael Freeman – assistant mixing 
 Matt Glasbey – assistant engineering
 Pierre Houle – additional engineering 
 Adnan Joubran – additional engineering
 Matt Latham – assistant engineering 
 Baptiste Leroy – assistant engineering
 Bastien Lozier – additional engineering 
 Issam Murad – assistant engineering
 Lance Robinson – additional engineering
 Davide Rossi – additional engineering 
 Anthony De Souza – assistant engineering 
 Federico Vindver – additional engineering
 Matt Wolach – assistant mixing 

 Pilar Zeta – design, art direction

Charts

Weekly charts

Year-end charts

Certifications and sales

See also 
 List of number-one albums of 2019 (Australia)
 List of number-one albums of 2019 (Belgium)
 List of number-one albums of 2019 (France)
 List of number-one albums of 2019 (Mexico)
 List of number-one albums of 2019 (Scotland)
 List of UK Albums Chart number ones of the 2010s

Release history

Notes

References

External links

2019 albums
Coldplay albums
Albums produced by Max Martin
Albums produced by Rik Simpson
Atlantic Records albums
Parlophone albums
Political music albums by English artists